Reese's Take 5 is a candy bar that was released by The Hershey Company in December 2004. The original name of the candy bar was TAKE5 but common usage among consumers added a space. In June 2019, when the candy bar became part of the Reese's family, the name was officially changed to Reese's Take 5.   The "5" in the name refers to the combination of five ingredients: chocolate, peanuts, caramel, peanut butter, and pretzels.  This unique combination of ingredients earned Reese's Take 5 top honors in the 2019 LA Times official candy bar power rankings. The Take5 was known as Max 5 in Canada but has since been discontinued. Take5 has returned to Canada in the fall of 2020, under the name "Oh Henry Level Up".

Product changes
Although continuously producing the Take 5 using the original ingredients, The Hershey Company also produced several variations of the Take 5 after its initial release in 2004:

Chocolate Cookie – Substitutes a chocolate cookie to replace the pretzel
Marshmallow (limited edition) – Substitutes a marshmallow creme to replace the caramel
Peanut butter – Has a peanut butter coating instead of milk chocolate
White chocolate – Has a white chocolate coating instead of milk chocolate

The wrappers for these Take 5 variations show the ingredient substitutions.

At the beginning of 2016, Hershey partnered with a panel of "diverse millennial-aged students" to design a new wrapper and logo for the candy as part of a comeback campaign. (Advertising for Take 5 had been cut in 2011, due to Hershey struggling to find the best way to market the brand.) The new wrapper had a black background with ringed gray stripes and a new lime green logo. According to Take 5's brand manager, the new marketing campaign would focus on targeting millennials. The brand also used Twitter, Facebook, and Tumblr to revitalize its name.

In June 2019, the candy was renamed to Reese's Take 5 and underwent a packaging change, with the primary color of the package changing from black to orange  Also in June 2019, Hershey released that the ingredient peanut butter in TAKE5 has always been Reese's Peanut Butter.

Reese's Take 5 is sold as Reese's Overload in the UK

Formulation changes
Take 5, amongst other candy bar products often included cocoa butter, a fat derived from the cocoa bean. However, beginning in 2006 the price for cocoa butter began to increase dramatically, by 2008 the price per ton had increased from $4,000 to $8,100. This placed pressure on Hershey and other chocolate manufacturers to reduce costs. Staple products such as the Reese's peanut butter cups and Hershey's Kisses were not affected by the price change, but other products from the manufacturer saw a change in their composition, cocoa butter was substituted with other cheaper products, such as vegetable and sesame seed oil.

Nutrition information
In September 2016 Hershey led the SmartLabel initiative, becoming the first brand to adopt that Grocery Manufacturers Association consumer-transparent packaging standard.  
One serving of Reese's Take 5 chocolate bar contains the following:
210 calories, 
Total Fat  11g
 Saturated fat  5g
 Trans fat  0g
Cholesterol  0g
Total Carbohydrate  26g
Dietary fiber  1g
Total sugars  18g
includes 17g added sugar
Protein  3g
Vitamin D  0.1mcg
Calcium  30mg
Iron  1.2mg
Potassium  120mg

Records
On January 31, 2020, the Hershey Company made a gigantic Take 5 chocolate bar that weighs 5,943 pounds. This bar holds the Guinness World Record for largest chocolate nut bar with the size measurements being 9 by 5.5 by 2 feet.

References

External links
 

The Hershey Company brands
Food and drink introduced in 2004
Brand name confectionery
Chocolate bars
Pretzels
Peanut dishes
Chocolate